"Living in a Tree" is the title name from a Chinese writing question in Zhejiang Province's National College Entrance Examination paper in the year of 2020. It became popular because of an essay written by a high school student. The content of the essay included a lot of rarely-used Chinese characters and quotes by famous people. The grading team gave such an essay the highest score, 60/60, even though the first grader gave it a 39/60, and the second and third graders gave it 55/60.

A journal editing group hosted by Zhejiang International Studies University published that essay along with a comment from the leader of the grading team, Chen Jianxin, through their official WeChat account on August 2, 2020, but the WeChat post was soon being deleted.

Fan Yiying of Sixth Tone wrote that the contents included "abstruse European philosophy, from Nietzsche and MacIntyre to Heidegger and Wittgenstein".

When users on social media in that country learned about the paper, according to Fan, the conversation became "heated". After the publication the Zhejiang Education Examinations Authority began investigating one of the graders for having a conflict of interest in also writing test preparation guides.

Notefoot

References

External links
 
 
 

Education in China
WeChat